Deobandi fiqh is a school of Islamic jurisprudence that is based on the Hanafi school of Islamic law. It is associated with the Deobandi movement, which originated in India in the late 19th century and has since spread to other parts of the world, particularly in South Asia. Deobandi fiqh emphasizes a strict adherence to the Quran and the Sunnah (the traditions of the Prophet Muhammad), and seeks to ensure that all aspects of daily life are guided by Islamic law. It places a strong emphasis on the principles of fiqh, or Islamic jurisprudence, and is known for its strict interpretation of Islamic law. It also emphasizes the importance of Islamic ethics and morality, and emphasizes the need for Muslims to lead a pious and virtuous life. Deobandi fiqh has had a significant influence on Islamic education and scholarship, particularly in South Asia and among the global South Asian diaspora. It has also been associated with various Islamic political movements and has been a subject of controversy and debate within the Muslim community.

Definition 

Fiqh is a term used in Islamic jurisprudence to refer to the understanding and application of Islamic law. It is the process of understanding and interpreting the sources of Islamic law, which include the Quran, Sunnah (the actions and sayings of the Prophet Muhammad), the consensus of the scholars (Ijma), and analogical reasoning (Qiyas), in order to derive legal rulings for specific situations. Fiqh covers a wide range of topics including acts of worship, family law, commercial law, criminal law, and international relations.

Deobandism refers to a movement within Sunni Islam that originated in the town of Deoband, India, in the late 19th century. The Deobandi movement was initially a reformist movement aimed at reviving traditional Islamic scholarship and practice in the region, and is associated with the founding of the Darul Uloom Deoband in 1866. Deobandism and Fiqh are closely related, the scholars and leaders associated with the Deobandi movement, particularly those from the Darul Uloom Deoband in India, have developed a unique interpretation of Hanafi fiqh that is influenced by their own intellectual tradition and religious outlook. Deobandi fiqh emphasizes a strict adherence to the Quran and Sunnah, and follows a methodology of legal reasoning that is based on the principles and teachings of Imam Abu Hanifa, the founder of the Hanafi school. This methodology involves the use of legal analogy (qiyas), consensus (ijma), and other sources of Islamic law to derive legal rulings for specific situations. The Deobandi scholars and leaders have also emphasized the need to purify Islamic practice from what they see as deviations and innovations, and to resist the influence of Western culture and colonialism. This has led to a particular focus on issues of Islamic identity, morality, and education, as well as a critical engagement with contemporary political and social issues.

History and development
In the 19th century, the British colonial authorities established a system of secular education in India, which had a significant impact on the study of fiqh. Many Muslims saw the study of Islamic law as incompatible with the new education system, and as a result, the study of fiqh began to decline. However, in the late 19th century, there was a significant revival of interest in Islamic scholarship in India, leading to the establishment of many new madrasas, among them Darul Uloom Deoband, which became the center of the Deobandi movement. 

Darul Uloom Deoband was established on May 30, 1866, by a group of Islamic scholars, led by Muhammad Qasim Nanautavi and Rashid Ahmad Gangohi. They founded the institution in response to what they perceived as a decline in Islamic scholarship in India. Since then, Darul Uloom Deoband has become one of the most influential Islamic institutions globally, training thousands of Islamic scholars and clerics, many of whom have gone on to establish their own madrasas and Islamic institutions. Consequently, Darul Uloom Deoband has become the center of a chain of madrasas that extends across South Asia and beyond. These madrasas are commonly known as Deobandi madrasas, named after the town of Deoband and the teachings of Darul Uloom Deoband. Deobandi madrasas prioritize the study of classical Islamic texts such as the Qur'an, Hadith, and Islamic jurisprudence. They follow a traditional methodology known as the Dars-i Nizami curriculum. These madrasas are prevalent in various parts of the world, with a particularly strong presence in South Asia, but also in other regions such as Southeast Asia, Africa, and the Middle East. In such madrasas, there is often a separate department called Darul Ifta where Deobandi fiqh is practiced, serving as the primary source for the development of Deobandi fiqh. In India, numerous madrasas follow the Deobandi teachings, including Mazahir Uloom, Madinatul Uloom Bagbari, Jamia Islamia Talimuddin, Darul Uloom Nadwatul Ulama, Madrasa Aminia, Madrasa Shahi, and Darul Uloom Waqf. In Bangladesh, these madrasas are known as Qawmi madrasas, and they include Darul Uloom Hathazari, Al Jamia Al Islamia Patiya, Jamia Qurania Arabia Lalbagh, Al-Jamiah Al-Islamiah Obaidia Nanupur, and Jamiatul Uloom Al-Islamia Lalkhan Bazar. Pakistan also has a strong presence of Deobandi madrasas, such as Darul Uloom Karachi, Darul Uloom Haqqania, Jamia Ashrafia, Jamia Tur Rasheed, Jamia Uloom-ul-Islamia, Jamia Binoria, Jamia Faridia, Jamia Farooqia, and Jamia Khairul Madaris. In South Africa, Deobandi madrasas such as Darul Uloom Zakariyya, Darul Uloom Newcastle, and Madrasah In'aamiyyah are notable. The United Kingdom also has several Deobandi madrasas, including Darul Uloom London, Darul Uloom Bury, Madinatul Uloom Al Islamiya, and Darul Uloom Bolton. An example of a Deobandi madrasa from Iran is Darul Uloom Zahedan.

The Department of Fatwa, also known as Darul Ifta, has its origins in the Indian subcontinent where it was established at Darul Uloom Deoband. The institution was renowned for the ulama (Islamic scholars) who taught there and many people would come from far and wide to seek their guidance on Islamic regulations. However, due to the ulama's teaching commitments, they were often unable to provide timely answers to people's questions. To address this issue, the madrasa assigned Yaqub Nanautawi, a respected teacher, the responsibility of answering theological queries. After his death, this task was taken on by other teachers until, due to the growing number of people seeking answers, a separate department of fatwa was established within the madrasa in 1892 under the name of Darul Ifta. The department was led by Aziz-ul-Rahman Usmani, the first mufti appointed to the position.

Deobandi fiqh and its affiliated movement have since gained considerable influence in many parts of the Islamic world, particularly in South Asia, and have given rise to various political and religious movements. These movements have been involved in a range of activities, from religious education to political activism and even armed conflict, and continue to play a crucial role in shaping the intellectual and cultural landscape of Sunni Islam.

Contemporary Deobandism
In addition to the established networks of madrasas and similar institutions, Deobandi fiqh operates today through various Islamic organizations that frequently organize seminars and publish research papers. For example, the Islamic Fiqh Academy (India) is a well-known organization dedicated to promoting Islamic jurisprudence and providing guidance on religious issues. Established in 1989 under the All India Muslim Personal Law Board - the apex body of Indian Muslims - the Academy aims to examine and resolve contemporary issues faced by Muslims in India and worldwide in accordance with Islamic jurisprudence. The Academy conducts research, publishes papers and books, and organizes seminars and conferences on a wide range of topics related to Islamic law and its modern-day applications. Its activities span various areas of Islamic law, including family law, commercial law, criminal law, and contract law. The Academy also offers guidance on contemporary issues such as bioethics, finance, and social justice. Alongside its research and publishing work, the Islamic Fiqh Academy of India provides training and education to scholars and students of Islamic law, running courses and training programs to promote the study and comprehension of Islamic law and its practical applications. Furthermore, the Academy engages in community outreach activities, such as public lectures, workshops, and awareness campaigns, to promote a better understanding of Islam and its values. It collaborates with other Islamic organizations and scholars in India and worldwide to promote interfaith dialogue and cooperation.

The Deobandi fiqh utilizes a variety of methods for development, including the publication of magazines and newsletters. One such publication is Bayyināt, a monthly magazine published from Jamia Uloom-ul-Islamia in Pakistan that primarily focuses on topics related to the Deobandi school of thought. This magazine features articles covering Islamic theology, jurisprudence, history, and contemporary issues affecting the Muslim community. Known for its conservative views, Bayyināt enjoys popularity among the Deobandi community in Pakistan. Another publication, The Majlis: Voice of Islam, is an ultra-conservative newsletter founded by Ahmad Sadeq Desai and published from South Africa. This monthly newsletter covers topics such as Islamic jurisprudence, theology, and contemporary issues, and is recognized for its strong language and uncompromising stance on issues related to Islam. While The Majlis has faced criticism for promoting intolerance and extremism, it still holds a significant following among conservative Muslims in South Africa and has been influential in shaping the discourse surrounding Islam in the country. Additionally, AlKawsar, a research-oriented monthly magazine published from Bangladesh and associated with Markazud Dawah Al Islamia, has gained recognition for its high-quality publications since its establishment in 2005.

Typically, the Deobandi fiqh adheres to the Hanafi school of thought, but in some madrasas in South Africa, the Shafi'i fiqh is also taught and practiced, depending on the situation. One such institution is Darul Uloom Newcastle, which was founded in 1973 by Cassim Sema.

Methodology 

The methodology of Deobandi fiqh is largely based on the principles and teachings of the Hanafi school of thought, which emphasizes the importance of scholarly consensus (ijma), analogy (qiyas), and legal reasoning (ijtihad) in the interpretation and application of Islamic law. The Deobandi scholars also place a strong emphasis on the study of the Quran and Hadith, as well as the works of classical Islamic scholars, such as Abu Hanifa, Al-Ghazali, and Shah Waliullah Dehlawi. In addition to these traditional sources of Islamic knowledge, the Deobandi fiqh also draws on the teachings and practices of the founder of the Deobandi movement, Muhammad Qasim Nanautavi, and his successors. The Deobandi methodology places a particular emphasis on the study and transmission of Islamic knowledge through a system of madrasas (Islamic seminaries), which provide a structured curriculum of Islamic studies that covers topics such as Quranic exegesis, Hadith studies, Islamic law, theology, and spirituality. This emphasis on Islamic education and scholarship has been a defining feature of the Deobandi movement and has contributed to its spread and influence in many parts of the Muslim world.

Bid'ah 

Bid'ah, meaning innovation in Islam, is any recently introduced belief or practice that does not align with established Islamic teachings or traditions. This deviation from the Sunnah, or the way of the Prophet Muhammad, is generally considered negative. The concept of Bid'ah in Islam has several classifications, with Bid'ah Hasanah (praiseworthy innovation) and Bid'ah Sayyiah (blameworthy innovation) being the most common. The Deoband school, founded during the Indian reformist tradition, contributed to this reform of Bid'ah. While opinions on the definition of Bid'ah vary among different scholars and schools of thought, the Deobandi concept of Bid'ah is specific and limited. Rashid Ahmad Gangohi referred to Shah Muhammad Ishaq's definition of Bid'ah via Arbain: "Any practice not reported from the salaf (ancestors) as ibadat (a religious duty) that is performed as ibadat is bidat." Gangohi rejected the classification of good and bad Bid'ah, saying "There is no Bid'ah as a good Bid'ah. The one called good is actually the Sunnat." Ashraf Ali Thanwi concurred, saying a real Bid'ah would always be bad, and the good Bid'ah is Bid'ah only in form, but in reality, it is Sunnat because it is part of some general principle of religion. According to Thanwi, Bid'ah is defined as accepting any matter that is not part of religion (din) in particular or in general, as part of din by way of acknowledgment or practice.

Taqlid and Ijtihad 

Taqlid and Ijtihad are two important concepts in Islamic law that govern how legal opinions are derived and applied. While there are different views on their relative importance, both Taqlid and Ijtihad have a role to play in ensuring that Islamic law is properly interpreted and applied in accordance with the sources of law. Taqlid is widely accepted in Islamic scholarship as a valid approach to legal interpretation and application, especially for laypeople who do not have the necessary knowledge or expertise to derive legal opinions from primary sources. On the other hand, Ijtihad is also widely recognized as an important means of adapting Islamic law to new contexts and challenges. Ijtihad involves independent legal reasoning, where a qualified scholar uses the sources of law to derive new legal opinions in situations where there is no clear precedent or guidance. This can involve analogical reasoning (qiyas), where the scholar draws analogies between existing legal rulings and new situations, or other forms of reasoning. There are different views on the relative importance of Taqlid and Ijtihad in Islamic law. Some scholars and schools of thought emphasize the importance of Taqlid, viewing it as an essential means of preserving the coherence and integrity of Islamic law. Others view Ijtihad as a necessary means of adapting Islamic law to new contexts and challenges, and believe that Taqlid should be applied with caution and flexibility. The Deobandi School of thought, for example, emphasizes the importance of Taqlid, especially strict adherence to the Hanafi School of jurisprudence. Deobandi scholars view Taqlid as an important means of ensuring that Islamic law is properly followed and interpreted, especially for those who do not possess the requisite knowledge and expertise to engage in Ijtihad. They also believe that Ijtihad is necessary for the evolution of Islamic law, but should be undertaken with caution and respect for the traditions of Islamic scholarship. Rashid Ahmad Gangohi, emphasized the obligation of Taqlid, citing the Quranic verse that states, "Ask the people of knowledge if you do not know." (16:43) He also distinguished between individual and non-individual Taqlid, where individual Taqlid involves following the opinion of one scholar in all matters of importance, and non-individual Taqlid involves inquiring of any scholar, whom one likes. Similarly, Ashraf Ali Thanwi, defined Ijtihad and Taqlid as follows. He stated that legally reliable qiyas (analogical reasoning) could either be that of every person in whatever he thinks or only of some persons. However, it is evident that not everyone's qiyas is reliable according to the Quranic verse that states, "If they had referred it to the prophet and the people of authority from among themselves, those who are able to think out the matter would have known it."(4:83) Therefore, there are some persons whose qiyas is reliable and some whose qiyas is not reliable. One whose qiyas is reliable is called mujtahid and mustanbit, and others are called muqallid. Hence, it is obligatory for a muqallid to follow a mujtahid.

Fuqahā’ 

A faqih (plural=‘fuqahā’) is a scholar who has gained mastery in interpreting and applying the various sources of Islamic law, including the Quran, Hadith, and the consensus of scholars, to practical situations. Several Deobandi scholars have made significant contributions to Islamic jurisprudence in the Indian subcontinent and beyond, earning recognition as faqihs. These include:

Rashid Ahmad Gangohi, born in 1828 in the Indian village of Gangoh. A prominent member of the Deobandi school of thought, he was renowned for his deep understanding of Islamic law, particularly in the Hanafi school of thought. Fatawa-e-Rashidiya, a collection of his fatwas on various Islamic legal issues, is considered one of his most important works. Known for their detail and depth, the fatwas in this collection remain a valuable resource for scholars and students of Islamic law.

Aziz-ul-Rahman Usmani, another notable scholar, was born in 1892 and passed away in 1974. He was a leading figure in the Deobandi school of thought and authored numerous works on Islamic law and theology. Fiqh al-Islam, one of his most important works, is an extensive and detailed exposition of Hanafi fiqh and is regarded as one of the most authoritative works on Hanafi fiqh in the Urdu language.

Ashraf Ali Thanwi, born in 1863 and passing away in 1943, was another renowned figure in Islamic scholarship and a leading figure in the Deobandi school of Islamic thought. He wrote several works on Islamic law and spirituality and was known for his contributions to the field of Tasawwuf (Islamic mysticism). His collection of fatwas on various Islamic legal issues, Imdad al-Fatawa, is widely respected for its clarity and accessibility, making it an essential resource for scholars and students of Islamic law.

Kifayatullah Dehlawi, born in Delhi in 1864 and passed away in 1948, was a respected faqih and a well-known scholar of Islamic law in the Indian subcontinent. He was an expert in the Hanafi school of thought and a prominent member of the Deobandi school of thought. His most significant work is Kifayat al-Mufti, a comprehensive collection of his fatwas on various legal issues. The book, which is divided into nine volumes, is a valuable resource for scholars and students of Islamic law. He also wrote Ta'lim al-Islam, a primer on Islamic beliefs and practices for children, which covers topics such as the pillars of Islam, the articles of faith, and daily religious practices. The book is widely read and has become a popular textbook in many madrasas in the Indian subcontinent and beyond.

Muhammad Shafi Deobandi was a well-known Islamic scholar and jurist who was born in India in 1916. He studied under various scholars and eventually became a mufti himself, issuing fatwas (legal opinions) on various Islamic matters. He authored a number of books, including Imdad al-Muftiyyin, which is a commentary on the famous Hanafi legal text, Al-Hidayah.

Mahmood Hasan Gangohi was also a notable Islamic scholar and jurist from India who lived from 1919 to 1996. He was a student of several renowned scholars and was known for his expertise in Hanafi fiqh (Islamic jurisprudence). He authored several works, including Fatawa Mahmudiyya, which is a collection of his legal opinions on a variety of Islamic topics.

Nizamuddin Azami was a well-known Islamic scholar and jurist from India who lived from 1918 to 2000. He was known for his expertise in Hanafi fiqh and was a prolific writer and teacher. He authored several works, including Muntakhabat-e-Nizam al-Fatawa, which is a collection of his legal opinions on various Islamic topics. He also played a key role in the revival of traditional Islamic learning in India and was a mentor to many prominent Islamic scholars.

Rashid Ahmed Ludhianvi was a prominent Islamic scholar and religious leader in Pakistan who had a deep knowledge of Islamic jurisprudence (fiqh). He was born on June 10, 1938, in the city of Ludhiana, Punjab, India, and was taught by Muhammad Shafi Deobandi. He is also renowned for his contributions to Islamic jurisprudence through his work Ahsan ul-Fatawa, a comprehensive collection of legal opinions and rulings that cover a wide range of issues in Islamic law. Although based on the principles of the Hanafi school of Islamic law, he draws from other schools of Islamic law, such as the Shafi'i and Maliki schools. Ahsan ul-Fatawa is highly regarded among scholars of Islamic law and is often used as a reference for fatwas in many parts of the world.

Muhammad Faizullah, a prominent Islamic scholar and jurist from Bangladesh, was born in 1890 and passed away in 1976. He held the position of Grand Mufti of East Pakistan and later Bangladesh, and was widely respected for his profound knowledge of Islamic jurisprudence. Faizullah's significant contribution to Islamic scholarship was his work on Fatawa-e-Darul Uloom Hathazari, which is a comprehensive collection of Islamic legal opinions or fatwas. Faizullah served as head mufti at Darul Uloom Hathazari, renowned for its scholarship and for producing many notable Islamic scholars.

Mujahidul Islam Qasmi was born on 1936, in the town of Darbhanga in the state of Bihar, India, and passed away on 4 April 2002. He was a renowned Islamic scholar and served as the Chief Mufti of Imarat-e-Shari'yah, founder of Islamic Fiqh Academy, India and president of the All India Muslim Personal Law Board. Qasmi was known for his extensive knowledge of Islamic jurisprudence and was particularly influential in the issuance of fatwas (legal opinions) on a wide range of issues. He authored several books on Islamic law and was respected for his balanced and moderate approach to interpreting Islamic texts. His contributions to Islamic scholarship and the issuance of fatwas have left a lasting impact on the Muslim community in India and beyond.

Abdur Rahman Chatgami, popularly known as Faqihul Millat, was born in 1920 in Brahmanbaria, Bangladesh. He was a prominent Islamic scholar and jurist who served as the Grand Mufti of Bangladesh and was known as the "Jurist of the Nation." In 1991, he founded the Islamic Research Center Bangladesh (IRCB), which was established for advanced research in Islamic jurisprudence and law. Under Chatgami's supervision, Fatawa-e Faqihul Millat was compiled and published in 2020 by the IRCB. The book is a comprehensive compilation of over 5,000 fatwas on various topics of Islamic law and is significant as it is the first complete fatwa book in the Bengali language.

Taqi Usmani, born on October 5th, 1943, is a renowned scholar of Deobandi movement who specializes in contemporary fiqh issues. He is the son of Muhammad Shafi Deobandi and is considered a leading authority in the Islamic banking sector worldwide. He is regarded as the intellectual head of the Deobandi School and is also respected outside the school as an important figure in the successful Islamic revivalist initiative known as the Deobandi movement. His views and fatwas carry significant weight among Deobandi scholars globally, including those at the Deoband seminary in India. As a consultant to several international Islamic financial institutions, he has played a pivotal role in establishing interest-free banking and Islamic financial institutions. He is a member of various global organizations, including the Islamic Fiqh Council of the Organization of Islamic Conference (OIC) based in Jeddah. He presently serves as the Vice-president of Darul Uloom Karachi.

Khalid Saifullah Rahmani (born 1956) is another contemporary Deobandi faqih who specializes in Islamic jurisprudence. He currently serves as the General Secretary of the Islamic Fiqh Academy India. Rahmani obtained his degree from Darul Uloom Deoband and is the nephew of Mujahidul Islam Qasmi. Rahmani is a prolific author who has written over 50 books on a wide range of Islamic topics. He established Al-Ma'hadul Ali al-Islami in Hyderabad, where he introduced specialization and super specialization in Islamic education. His broad outlook, ability to provide solutions to modern challenges, and his representation of Islam in the media have earned him widespread respect among all sections of the Muslim community in India.

Literature 
Deobandi fiqh literature is a rich and extensive collection of Islamic jurisprudence and an essential part of the Islamic legal tradition. The works of Deobandi scholars have made significant contributions to the field of Islamic jurisprudence, including Fatwa collections, Principles of Islamic jurisprudence (Uṣūl al-fiqh), modern issues, Fiqh al quran, Fiqh al Hadith, and commentary on traditional texts. These works continue to be widely studied and referenced by scholars and students of Islamic law.

Fatwa collections 

Deobandi Fatwa literature comprises compilations of Islamic legal opinions (fatawa) issued by scholars of the Deobandi school of thought. These fatawa offer guidance on various aspects of Islamic law, including worship, transactions, marriage, inheritance, and other important issues. Among the most famous works of Deobandi Fatawa literature is Fatawa-e-Rashidiya, written by renowned scholar Rashid Ahmad Gangohi. This comprehensive collection of legal opinions covers a broad range of topics, including worship, marriage, trade, and inheritance, and is highly respected for its detailed and nuanced analysis of legal issues. Other notable works include Imdad-ul-Fatawa by Ashraf Ali Thanwi, Fatawa Mazahir Uloom by Khalil Ahmad Saharanpuri, Kifayat al-Mufti by Kifayatullah Dehlawi, and Fatawa Darul Uloom Deoband and Fatawa Imarat-e-Shariyah, both collections of legal opinions issued by scholars of prestigious Islamic institutions.

Muhammad Shafi Deobandi authored Imdad-al-Muftiyyin and Jawahir al-Fiqh, both considered his most comprehensive works on the subject. The former is a compilation of his fatwas on various topics, while the latter is a seven-volume collection of his detailed legal opinions. Fatawa Mahmoodiyah is a multi-volume work by Mahmood Hasan Gangohi, covering a wide range of topics related to Islamic law. Another notable work is Imdad al-Ahkam by Ashraf Ali Thanwi, which is considered an authoritative reference in the Deobandi school of thought. Muntakhabat-e-Nizam al-Fatawa is a collection of selected fatwas issued by Nizamuddin A'zami, and Ahsan al-Fatawa is a comprehensive collection of religious rulings compiled by Rashid Ahmed Ludhianvi.

Deobandi Fatwa literature also includes various collections of fatwas authored by prominent scholars of the Deobandi school. These collections include Imdad al-Muftiyin by Shaft Sahab Usmani Deobandi, Fatawa Shaikh-al-Islam by Hussain Ahmed Madani, Khair al-Fatawa by Khair Muhammad Jalandhari, Nizam al-Fatawa and Fatawa Nizamia by Nizamuddin A'zami, Fatawa Rahimiya by Abdur Rahim Lajpuri, Fatawa Haqqaniyah by Abdul Haq Akorwi, Fatawa Mufti Mahmud by Mufti Mehmood, Fatawa Qadi by Mujahidul Islam Qasmi, Ap ke Masayil awr unka Hal by Yusuf Ludhianvi, Thaminat al-Fatawa by Muhammad Ya'qub Sharodi of Pakistan, Fatawa Faridiyah by Muhammad Farid Pakistani, Fatawa Ihya al-Uloom by Yasin Mubarakpuri, Jami' al-Fatawa by Meharban Ali Barotwi and Ishaq Multani, Fatawa Usmani by Taqi Usmani, Marghüb al-Fatawa by Marghoob Ahmad Lajpuri, Mahmud al-Fatawa by Ahmad Khanpuri, Habib al-Fatawa by Habibullah Qasmi, Kitab al-Fatawa by Khalid Saifullah Rahmani, Fatawa Habibiya by Habibur Rahman Khairabadi, Kitab al-Nawazil by Muhammad Salman Mansūrpuri, Kitab al-Masayil by Muhammad Salman Mansūrpuri, Fatawa Qasmiya by Shabbir Ahmad Qasmi of Morādābād in 26 volumes, Din-e-Fitrat: Ap ke Masayil awr unka Hal by Azizur Rahman Fatehpuri, Fatawa-e Rahmania by Mansurul Haq, and Fatawa-e Jamia by Jamia Islamia Yunusia, Fatawa-e Faqihul Millat by Abdur Rahman Chatgami, Fatawa-e Darul Uloom Hathazari by Darul Uloom Hathazari, Fatawa o Masail by Abdus Salam Chatgami, Ahkame-e Zindegi by Hemayet Uddin and Fatawa Ulama-e-Hind by Anisur Rahman Qasmi.

In addition to the extensive collection of fatwas, Deobandi scholars have produced countless pieces of literature on both general and specific fiqh topics. One of the most notable works in this tradition is Talifat-e-Rashidiya, a collection of treatises by Rashid Ahmad Gangohi. Another prominent work is Ahsan al-Qira fi Tawziḥ Awthaq al-Ura, a treatise on the Friday prayer in villages, authored by Mahmud Hasan Deobandi. For women, Bahishti Zewar is a popular book containing fiqh and other issues, written by Ashraf Ali Thanwi. The famous series of books for children, Talim al-Islam, is another notable work from the Deobandi tradition. It contains fiqhi issues in a question-and-answer style and is authored by Kifayatullah Dehlawi. Kitab al-Faskh wa-al-Tafriq, a book on the annulment of nikah, is authored by Abd al-Samad Rahmani, and Mutid al-Warithin is a book on inheritance authored by Asghar Hussain Deobandi. Asghar Hussain Deobandi has also compiled a book of fatwas given by the Prophet himself in Fatawa Muhammadi, as well as authoring Mirath al-Muslimin. For those undertaking the Hajj, Ahkam-e-Hajj, authored by Muhammad Shafi Deobandi, is a useful resource. Compendiums of Islamic law regarding Muslim Personal Laws in India include Islami Adalat by Mujahidul Islam Qasmi and Majmu'ah Qawanin-e-Islami by Minnatullah Rahmani and others. Idah al-Masalik, a book on different fiqhi issues, is authored by Shabbir Ahmad Moradabadi, while Idah al-Manasik is a book on rulings of Hajj and Umrah by the same author. Rif'at Qasmi authored Masayil Rifat, a series of books on various topics of Fiqh in seven volumes. Other works on specific issues include Masayil Sajdah Saho by Habibur Rahman Khairabadi, which addresses rulings related to errors in Salah, and Ahkam Luhüm al-Khail by Badrul Hasan Qasmi, which discusses rulings related to horse meat. Fatawa Tatarkhaniya of Alim Abul Ala al-Dehlawi, edited by Qādi Sajjad Hussain in five volumes, and Fatawa Tatārkhāniya of Alim Abul Ala al-Dehlawi, edited by Shabbir Ahmad Qasmi in 20 volumes, are both notable works in the Deobandi fatwa literature. Mukhtarat al-Nawazil of al-Marghinani, edited by Khalid Saifullah Rahmani and others in four volumes, and Qamus al-Fiqh, a dictionary of Fiqh, by Khalid Saifullah Raḥmāni in five volumes, are also important works. Burhanuddin Sambhali addresses social issues in his book Mu'ashrati Masayil.

Uṣūl al-fiqh 

Uṣūl al-fiqh is a foundational area of Islamic jurisprudence that studies the principles and methodology behind the derivation of Islamic legal rulings. Deobandi scholars have authored numerous valuable works on Uṣūl al-fiqh. Some examples of the works written by Deobandi scholars on Uṣūl al-fiqh include Fusool al-Hawashi by Maulavi Ainullah, which is an explanatory commentary on the famous book of Hanafi Fiqh, Al-Hidayah. Qawaed al-Fiqh by Khalid Saifullah Rahmani is an introduction to the principles of Islamic jurisprudence that covers topics such as the sources of Islamic law, the different types of evidence used in Islamic legal reasoning, and the principles used to derive legal rulings from the sources. Fiqh-e-Hanafi K-e-Usool Wa Zawabit by Ashraf Ali Thanwi covers the principles and rules of Hanafi Fiqh, providing a detailed explanation of the methodology used in Hanafi Fiqh and the principles that govern its legal rulings. Uṣūl al-fiqh by Manazir Ahsan Gilani is a detailed introduction to the principles of Islamic jurisprudence that covers topics such as the sources of Islamic law, the different types of evidence used in Islamic legal reasoning, and the principles used to derive legal rulings from the sources. Tasheel al-Uṣūl by Riyasat Ali Bijnori and Saeed Ahmad Palanpuri is a concise introduction to the principles of Islamic jurisprudence that covers the sources of Islamic law, the different types of evidence used in Islamic legal reasoning, and the principles used to derive legal rulings from the sources. Uṣūl al-fiqh by Obaidullah Asadi is a classic text on the principles of Islamic jurisprudence that provides a comprehensive and systematic explanation of the foundational principles of Islamic law. A'san Uṣūl al-fiqh by Khalid Saifullah Rahmani is a concise and informative overview of Uṣūl al-fiqh that provides an easy-to-understand explanation of the principles of Islamic jurisprudence, and Al-Qawaed al-Fiqhiya al-Mahmoodia by Abul Kalam Shafeeque is a valuable book that discusses all areas of the principles of jurisprudence in a comprehensive and detailed manner. Imdad al Fiqh by Mehraban Ali Barotvi is a short yet comprehensive book that aims to simplify the memorization of terms related to Uṣūl al-fiqh, providing a comprehensive list of the terms used in Islamic jurisprudence, their definitions, and their usage. Islami Adalat by Mujahidul Islam Qasmi is a book that exclusively deals with the matter of Islamic verdicts in the Islamic court, shedding light on the history of the Islamic judiciary and discussing the necessary conditions of deduction and inference. Usul al-Ifta wa Adabuhu is a comprehensive guide to the principles and etiquette of issuing fatwas in Islamic law, authored by Taqi Usmani.

Another example of Deobandi works on Uṣūl al-fiqh includes Ijtihad awr Taqlid ka Akhiri Faisala by Ashraf Ali Thanwi, compiled by Zaid Mazahiri, which discusses the final decision on following an Imam and making an independent interpretation. Muqaddimah Nur al-Idah by Izaz Ali Amrohi is the preface of the fiqhi textbook Nur al-Idah. Tadwin-e-Fiqh by Zafeeruddin Miftahi is the preface of Fatawa Darul Uloom Deoband. Ijma awr Qiyas ki Hujjiyat by Jamil Ahmad Sikrodwi talks about the authenticity of consensus and analogy. These works provide a detailed explanation of the methodology used in Islamic jurisprudence and the principles that govern its legal rulings.

Dars-i Nizami is predominantly followed in Deobandi madrasas, and includes various texts on Fiqh that have attracted the attention of Deobandi scholars. Many of these texts have been accompanied by notes, translations, or commentaries authored by these scholars. One such text that has been extensively commented upon is Al-Hidayah, with several renowned scholars having authored detailed commentaries on it, including the 16-volume Ashraf al-Hidayah by Jamil Ahmad Sikrodawi.

Fiqh al-Quran 
According to scholars, there are approximately 500 verses in the Quran that relate to Islamic rulings. Fiqh al-Quran is a branch of Islamic jurisprudence that deals with instructions and rulings for Muslims in the Quran. Ahkam al-Quran, written by Al-Jassas and Abu Bakr ibn al-Arabi respectively, are two renowned works on this topic. Deobandi scholars have also contributed significantly to this field, including the compilation of a lengthy and voluminous collection of a book entitled Ahkam al-Quran, by Zafar Ahmad Usmani, Muhammad Idris Kandhlawi, Muhammad Shafi Deobandi, and Jameel Ahmad Thanwi. Ashraf Ali Thanwi's Masael al-Sulook is another important work on the subject, which discusses the rulings and etiquettes of Sufism and spirituality. Tafsir books written by Deobandi scholars also deal with the subject of Fiqh al-Quran, with Muhammad Shafi Deobandi's Ma'ariful Qur'an being one of the most prominent works that elaborates on the verses pertaining to fiqhi issues and explains them in detail.

Fiqh al-Hadith 
Fiqh al-Hadith is the study of Islamic jurisprudence based on Hadith literature. Deobandi scholars have made significant contributions in this field. They published I'la al-Sunan, an encyclopedia of Hadiths related to fiqhi rulings, and edited and published many old books written by earlier Hanafi scholars, such as Bughyat al-Alma'i fi Takhrij al-Zaila'i, Al-Hujjah 'ala Ahl al-Madīnah, Sharh Kitab al-Athar, Fath al-Rahman fi Ithbat Madhhab al-Nu'man, and Rasool-e-Akram Ka Tariqa-e-Namaz. Deobandi scholars' Hadith commentaries generally contain jurisprudential material, such as Awjaz al-Masalik by Zakariyya Kandhlawi, Faiz al-Bari by Anwar Shah Kashmiri, Fath al-Mulhim by Shabbir Ahmad Usmani, Badhl al-Majhud by Khalil Ahmad Saharanpuri, and Ma'rif al-Sunan by Yusuf Banuri. One of the important works on Fiqh al-Hadith is Fath al-Rahman Fi Isbat-e-Mazhab al-Noman, authored by 'Abd al-Haqq al-Dehlawi and edited by Nizam-uddin.

Modern issues 
Modern fiqh literature covers a range of contemporary issues, such as technology, medical ethics, family planning, and modern economic systems, with the aim of providing a comprehensive understanding of Islamic law and its relevance to modern life. The Ulama of Deoband have contributed significantly to this field by exploring the old fiqh literature and compiling unprecedented classical fiqh literature. Their works have become one of the most important sources of modern fiqh literature. For example, Muhammad Shafi Deobandi wrote Alat-e-Jadida ke Shar'i Ahkam (Shari'ah rulings of modern tools), which explores the Islamic perspective on modern technology. Other notable works of modern fiqh literature include Minnatullah Rahmani's Islam awr Family Planning, which discusses the Islamic approach to family planning. Muhammad Taqi Amini wrote Islām aur Jadid Daur ke Masayil (Islam and the Issues of the Modern Age), which explores a range of modern issues from an Islamic perspective. Taqi Usmani's Fiqhi Maqalat is a collection of research papers on different modern issues of Fiqh, compiled in six volumes. Taqi Usmani wrote several works on modern economic issues, including Islam awr Jadid Ma'ishat w Tijarat (Islam and Modern Economy) in seven volumes and Islam awr Jadid Ma'ashi Masayil (Islam and Modern Economic Issues) in eight volumes. He also wrote Fiqh al-Buyu (Fiqhi Rulings of Business) in two volumes. Badrul Hasan Qasmi's Asr-e-Hadir ke Jadid Masayil (Modern Contemporary Issues) discusses the challenges of modern times from an Islamic perspective. Other notable works of modern fiqh literature include Halal-o-Haram (Lawful and Unlawful) by Khalid Saifullah Rahmani and Islami Bankari ki Bunyadein (Foundations of Islamic Banking) by Taqi Usmani. Ubaidullah Asadi's Al-Riba (Usury and Interest) explores the Islamic perspective on interest, while his Taḥdid Nasl awr Islami Ta'limat (Family Planning and Islamic Teachings) discusses family planning in light of Islamic teachings. Burhanuddin Sambhali's Maujūda Masayil ka Shar'i Ḥal provides a Shari'ah-compliant solution to modern economic issues, while his Jadid Medical Masayil tackles modern medical issues. Sambhali's Bank Insurance awr Sarkari Qarde offers insights into Islamic financial principles related to bank insurance and government loans. Khalid Saifullah Rahmani's Jadid Fiqhi Masayil comprise a five-volume collection of modern Fiqhi rulings, while Shabbir Ahmad Qasmi's Idah al-Masayil and Iḍāḥ al-Nawadir are collections of research papers on Fiqhi and modern issues, respectively. Mujahidul Islam Qasmi has edited several collections of research papers, including Shares awr Company, Darurat-o-Hajat, Jadīd Tijarati Shaklain, Awqaf, and Mabāḥith-e-Fiqhiya, which cover topics ranging from endowments to modern business modes. Zainul Islam Qasmi's Chand Aham Aşri Masayil is a two-volume work on some of the most important Fiqhi rulings of the modern era.

Encyclopedia 
Deobandi scholars also make noteworthy contributions to the field of Islamic jurisprudence through the authoring of comprehensive encyclopedic books. Inamul Haque Qasmi is one such scholar who has authored several such works, including Hajj Wa Umrah ke Masail Ka Encyclopedia, a four-volume book that covers all aspects of the pilgrimage of Hajj and Umrah, Qurbani Ke Masail Ka Encyclopedia, a comprehensive book that deals with sacrificial-related matters, Zakat Ke Masail Ka Encyclopedia, an encyclopedic book that covers all common and sophisticated issues related to the most valued act of Zakat, Namaz Ke Masail Ka Encyclopedia, a book that delves into various contemporary issues related to daily prayers, and Safar Ke Masail Ka Encyclopedia, a book that encompasses a wide range of rulings related to traveling.

Fiqh manuscript 
Deobandi scholars have also been involved in working on Fiqh manuscripts, including the publication of Fatawa Tatarkhaniya, a comprehensive thirty-volume collection of Islamic jurisprudence that was edited by Shabbir Ahmad Qasmi of Madrasa Shahi in 23 thick volumes. Additionally, there is Sinwan al-Qaza Wa Unwan al-Ifta, a book on judicature written by Qazi Emadudeen, which was published in four volumes by the Kuwait Ministry of Awqaf and Islamic Affairs. Another work is Fiqh al-Nawazil, an old book on Islamic issues that was revived by Khalid Saifullah Rahmani and annotated with footnotes.

Fatwas 

A fatwa is a legal opinion given by a qualified Islamic scholar, or mufti, regarding a specific issue based on their interpretation of Islamic law, or sharia. Fatwas can cover a wide range of topics, including religious practices, personal conduct, social issues, and political matters. In the Muslim community, fatwas carry significant weight, as they are considered authoritative guidance on Islamic law and are often sought by individuals seeking specific answers or guidance on particular issues. The Deobandi school of Islamic thought is well-known for its extensive issuance of legal opinions, or fatwas, on various topics. These fatwas have been highly influential in shaping the beliefs and practices of Muslims who follow the Deobandi school of thought, both in India and around the world. Notable fatwas issued by Deobandi scholars have covered various issues, such as education, social life, terrorism, and banking.

Education 
During the period of British colonial rule in India, there was a debate among Muslims over the permissibility of Western English education. The Deobandi scholars permitted the learning of English but with certain conditions. Rashid Ahmad Gangohi, a leading Deobandi scholar, allowed the learning of English on the condition that it does not result in any sinful actions or harm to religion. Another influential scholar, Ashraf Ali Thanwi, issued a fatwa on the topic, acknowledging that while English, like any other language, is not inherently evil, the circumstances surrounding its learning should be taken into account. Thanwi noted that if a Muslim can avoid the potential harms of learning English, such as exposure to non-Islamic sciences or irreligious individuals, and if the intention is to earn a lawful livelihood, then it is permissible. However, if the potential harms outweigh the benefits or if the learning of English is likely to lead to sinful actions or intentions, then it may be prohibited. Ultimately, Thanwi concluded that the permissibility of learning English depends on the situation and circumstances surrounding it.

Terrorism 

In 2008, the Islamic scholars of Darul Uloom Deoband issued a historic Fatwa against terrorism. Backed by over 6,000 Islamic scholars, the Fatwa declared that terrorism is anti-Islamic and that killing of innocent people, regardless of their religion or community, is against the principles of Islam. The Fatwa was issued at a conference attended by thousands of Islamic scholars and was seen as a significant move in the fight against terrorism in India and around the world. The Deoband Fatwa against Terrorism was welcomed as a positive step towards countering the misuse of religion to promote violence and emphasized that the true teachings of Islam advocate peace, compassion, and non-violence. It continues to serve as a beacon of hope and inspiration for all those who seek to promote peace and understanding between different communities and cultures.

Another notable Deobandi fatwa against terrorism, named Fatwa of Peace for Humanity, was issued by Farid Uddin Masood, the chairman of Bangladesh Jamiatul Ulama, a prominent Islamic organization in Bangladesh. Under his leadership, in 2016, over 100,000 Islamic scholars from Bangladesh endorsed a fatwa declaring terrorism as "haram" or forbidden, based on Islamic scripture and tradition. The fatwa emphasized that terrorism was a violation of the fundamental values of Islam and called on Muslims to work towards eradicating it. In a country that has experienced a number of high-profile terrorist attacks in recent years, the fatwa was seen as an important step towards countering extremist ideology and promoting a message of peace and tolerance.

Islamic banking and finance 

Islamic finance was first introduced in the 1970s as an interest-free banking system. Its primary objective is to ensure that financial transactions comply with Islamic law or shariah, which means avoiding interest-based transactions, excessive uncertainty or risk, and unethical practices. Islamic banking and finance have received mixed reactions from Muslims. While some have accepted Islamic finance as being in accordance with Islamic law, many ulama view it as equivalent to riba and therefore prohibited in Islam. Prominent Deobandi scholars, such as Taqi Usmani, have engaged globally in articulating Islamic finance theory and overseeing its implementation, authoring many books including An Introduction to Islamic Finance. However, some Deobandi scholars have raised concerns that modern Islamic banking and finance fall short of the minimum requirements needed to make it truly Islamic. They have produced a detailed critique of Islamic banking in a work titled Murawwaja Islami Bankari. In response, Taqi Usmani wrote Ghayr Sudi Bankari, addressing each point made against Islamic banking. The intra-Deobandi debate on Islamic banking has been ongoing for several decades, and there is no consensus among Deobandi scholars on the issue.

Digitalisation 
The digitization of fatwas reflects the current digital age, offering scholars a new platform to provide guidance to a global audience. With the widespread availability and accessibility of the internet, this trend has become increasingly prevalent. Many adherents of Deobandi fiqh use online platforms to disseminate their fatwas. To preserve historical records of the seminary and make them more accessible to scholars and researchers, Darul Uloom Deoband has decided to digitize hundreds of thousands of fatwas that have been issued since 1866. In 2002, Darul Uloom Deoband started its website journey, named Darulifta-Deoband.com, and established an Online Fatwa Department in 2005. By 2016, it had become the world's largest bilingual fatwa website. Notably, in 2010, almost 40% of the fatwas were issued online.

Askimam, founded by South African Islamic scholar and jurist Ebrahim Desai in 2000, is another example of the digitalization of Deobandi fiqh. It has been lauded for being more influential, wide-ranging, and comprehensive than the web resources of Al-Azhar University and its supporters combined. The Askimam website reflects the Deobandi Hanafi school of thought's outlook and recommends that people following other Sunni schools of thought seek guidance from their respective scholars.

Implementation in different countries

The implementation of Deobandi fiqh in the Khanate of Kalat is one of the earliest examples of its use. In 1939, ruler Ahmad of Kalat requested that scholars from Darul Uloom Deoband be sent to Kalat to draft laws and create unity in Balochistan. Two scholars, Qari Muhammad Tayyib and Shamsul Haq Afghani, were dispatched to Kalat and after drafting laws, Shamsul Haq Afghani remained in Balochistan to take charge of the administration of religious affairs. Baloch youth went to Deobandi madrasas and Ahmad of Kalat founded a madrasa called Jamia Nasiriya to educate Baloch students. In 1942, the governor of Kalat instructed the head of Jamia Nasiriya to select thirty academically advanced students to send to Darul Uloom Deoband for further study. After completing their studies, the scholars returned to Balochistan and influenced the religious beliefs, customs, culture, and appearance of the Baloch people. Some of the Deobandi scholars served as judges in Balochistan, and some reached the highest judicial positions, namely Qazi-ul-Quzat (Chief justice).

The Deobandi fiqh is extensively practiced in Afghanistan's judicial system. Additionally, this fiqh is also utilized in several countries for implementing Muslim personal law, issuing halal certificates, and in various other fields, through organizations such as the All Ceylon Jamiyyathul Ulama in Sri Lanka and the Muslim Judicial Council in South Africa.

Afghanistan 

The Taliban is a Islamic militant group that emerged in Afghanistan in the early 1990s. Their interpretation of Islamic law, known as Sharia, is central to their ideology and political program. They gained control of Afghanistan in the mid-1990s and ruled the country until 2001, when they were ousted by a US-led coalition following the 9/11 attacks. After 20 years of war and a negotiated peace agreement with the US, the Taliban regained control of Afghanistan in August 2021, following the withdrawal of American troops. Since then, they have announced that they intend to establish an Islamic Emirate of Afghanistan, and that Sharia law will be the basis for their governance. The Taliban's interpretation of Islamic law is largely based on the Deobandi school of Islamic jurisprudence and the Taliban's leadership includes many individuals who were educated in Deobandi madrasas (religious schools) in Pakistan and Afghanistan. The Taliban's interpretation of Deobandi fiqh (Islamic jurisprudence) is notable for its strict enforcement of Islamic law, including harsh punishments for crimes such as adultery, theft, and murder. The Taliban have also enforced strict dress codes for women, and have banned many forms of entertainment, such as music and television.

Pakistan 

The Deobandi school of thought has the majority following in Pakistan. Muhammad Zia-ul-Haq, who himself followed the Deobandi school of thought, gave priority to implementing Sunni policies and laws that were in line with Deobandi fiqh during his efforts to Islamize Pakistan. As President of Pakistan from 1977 to 1988, Zia-ul-Haq introduced several measures to create a more Islamic society. These included the Hudood Ordinances, which criminalized certain offenses according to Islamic law; the Zakat and Ushr Ordinance, which made it mandatory for Muslims to pay a tax on their wealth to support the poor and needy; and the Ramazan Ordinances, which made it illegal for Muslims to eat, drink, or smoke in public during the month of Ramadan. He also appointed Sami-ul-Haq, a prominent Deobandi scholar known as the father of the Taliban, as a Senator. Zia-ul-Haq reactivated the Council of Islamic Ideology and established the Federal Shariat Court and Shariat Appellate Bench to ensure that all laws were in accordance with Islamic principles. Leading Deobandi scholars, such as Muhammad Khan Sherani and Muhammad Hanif Jalandhari, have served as members of the Council of Islamic Ideology. Taqi Usmani and Khalid Mahmud, who are also prominent Deobandi figures, have acted as leading judges on the Federal Shariat Court and Shariat Appellate Bench.

India 

Although India is a secular state with a Muslim minority, the country has a separate set of laws known as the Muslim Personal Law, which dates back to the Muslim Personal Law (Shariat) Application Act, 1937. This law pertains to matters such as marriage, divorce, and inheritance for Muslims. The All India Muslim Personal Law Board (AIMPLB) is a non-governmental organization founded in 1973 to protect and defend the Muslim Personal Law in India. The organization was established in response to growing concerns among Indian Muslims regarding the potential erosion of their personal law, and to ensure their right to practice their religion and follow Islamic law. Founded by Darul Uloom Deoband's rector Qari Muhammad Tayyib, this Deobandi-dominated organization has a long history of advocating for the Muslim Personal Law in India. The AIMPLB's stance was brought into question during the landmark Shah Bano case of 1985. The organization opposed granting maintenance to Shah Bano, a divorced Muslim woman, on the grounds that it would violate the Islamic Personal Law. This case generated a great deal of controversy and led to a heated debate about the role of Islamic law in India. It also highlighted the tensions between the AIMPLB and the Indian state, particularly the Congress government led by Rajiv Gandhi, which sought to introduce reforms in the Muslim Personal Law. In response, the government passed the Muslim Women (Protection of Rights on Divorce) Act 1986, which overturned the Supreme Court's decision in the Shah Bano case and restricted the payment of maintenance to a limited period after divorce. The AIMPLB has also opposed attempts to introduce a uniform civil code, which would provide a single code of law for all citizens regardless of religion. In 2018, The AIMPLB proposed the establishment of Sharia courts, known as Darul Qaza, in every district of India to offer Muslims an alternative dispute resolution mechanism. However, the proposal sparked controversy as some critics raised concerns that it could undermine the authority of the Indian legal system and potentially result in the imposition of severe punishments that violate human rights. Despite criticism from some quarters, the AIMPLB continues to play a significant role in shaping the discourse on the Muslim Personal Law in India. Another notable Deobandi organization in India is Imarat Shariah, which operates in the states of Bihar, Odisha, and Jharkhand, with its headquarters located in the city of Patna, Bihar. Founded in 1921, it is considered one of the most prominent Islamic institutions in India. One of the services offered by Imarat-e-Shariah is Darul Qaza, which are Sharia courts operating within the institution to resolve disputes within the Muslim community according to Islamic law or Sharia. Although the decisions made by Darul Qaza are not legally binding, they are seen as a means for Muslims to resolve disputes in a manner that is consistent with their religious beliefs.

Bangladesh 

In January 2001, the High Court of Bangladesh issued a verdict banning all types of fatwas. This decision sparked the formation of the "Fatwa Protection Movement" in Bangladesh, led by Fazlul Haque Amini. Ten years later, in 2011, an appeal was heard in the Appellate Division, resulting in a new verdict announced on May 12, 2011. The Appellate Division invalidated the High Court's ruling, citing the fact that the existing law did not fully consider all aspects related to individuals, families, and social life. As a result, the Appellate Division acknowledged the potential need for fatwas in certain circumstances and issued a ruling permitting appropriately authorized individuals to issue them. In response, the "National Fatwa Board" was proposed with the cooperation of the top local muftis in Bangladesh. However, the proposal was put on hold when a committee on fatwas was established under the authority of the Al-Haiatul Ulya Lil-Jamiatil Qawmia Bangladesh. The committee included prominent muftis such as Mizanur Rahman Sayed and Muhammad Abdul Malek.

See also 
 Bibliography of Deobandi Movement
 Index of Deobandi movement–related articles

References 

Deobandi fiqh
Islamic jurisprudence
Law schools
Hanafi
Schools of Sunni jurisprudence